Clover Hill Creek (also known as Trib 28528 to Leggetts Creek) is a tributary of Leggetts Creek in Lackawanna County, Pennsylvania, in the United States. The upper reaches of the creek's watershed are on forested land and lightly populated residential land. However, the lower reaches are extensively channelized and culvertized.

Course
Clover Hill Creek begins on Bell Mountain in Dickson City. It flows south-southwest down the mountain for more than a mile before crossing a highway. The creek then continues flowing south-southwest alongside the highway, entering Scranton. A few tenths of a mile further downstream, it crosses Interstate 81 and reaches its confluence with Leggetts Creek.

Hydrology
Various Swales and inlets direct stormwater from roads into Clover Hill Creek. Biofiltration systems and various other systems have been recommended for this area.

Geography and geology

The headwaters of Clover Hill Creek are in springs on a ridge known as Bell Mountain. In its upper reaches, the creek has a steep course and is on a forested mountainside with numerous splash pools and rock ledge falls. However, there are some local roads nearby in the lightly inhabited residential Bell Mountain neighborhood. However, in its lower reaches, the creek has been severely channelized and flows next to a highway.

The channel of Clover Hill Creek is deeply incised near Hollow Road. It flows through a culvert under the Scranton/Carbondale Highway and through a riparap channel as it flows alongside that highway.

Watershed and biology
The creek is entirely within the United States Geological Survey quadrangle of Scranton.

Clover Hill Creek is a first-order stream. The main land uses in the watershed's upper reaches are forested land and residential land. Other land uses in the watershed include Highway Commercial. A small patch of wetland is located near the creek's middle reaches.

The riparian buffer of Clover Hill Creek is largely forested in its upper reaches. Further downstream, the buffer consists of meadow grasses and herbaceous plants. The creek is a Trout Stocked Fishery for its entire length.

History
Clover Hill Creek was entered into the Geographic Names Information System on January 1, 1990. Its identifier in the Geographic Names Information System is 1202403. The creek was added due to its presence on Patton's Philadelphia and Suburbs Street and Road Map, which was published in 1984. It is also known as "Trib 28528 to Leggetts Creek".

During heavy rains in 2013, Clover Hill Creek temporarily flooded over US Route 6, blocking off an entrance to the Viewmont Mall.

See also
Leach Creek, next tributary of Leggetts Creek going downstream
Summit Lake Creek, next tributary of Leggetts Creek going upstream
List of rivers of Pennsylvania
List of tributaries of the Lackawanna River

References

Rivers of Lackawanna County, Pennsylvania
Tributaries of the Lackawanna River
Rivers of Pennsylvania